The German-speaking population in the interwar Czechoslovak Republic, 23.6% of the population at the 1921 census, is usually reduced to the Sudeten Germans, but actually there were linguistic enclaves elsewhere in Czechoslovakia, and among the German-speaking urban dwellers there were "ethnic Germans" and/or Austrians as well as German-speaking Jews. 14% of the Czechoslovak Jews considered themselves as Germans at the 1921 census, but a much higher percentage declared German as their colloquial tongue during the last censuses under the Austro-Hungarian Empire.

Carpathian Germans and Sudeten Germans
The terms Carpathian Germans and Sudeten Germans are recent and were not traditionally used. The former was coined by historian and ethnologue Raimund Friedrich Kaindl (de) in the early 20th century. The latter was coined in 1904 by journalist and politician Franz Jesser (de) and was used mostly after 1919.

Historical settlements
There were several subregions and towns with German-speaking absolute or relative majorities in the interwar Czechoslovakian Republic.

<small>Table. 1921 ethnonational census</small>

In Bohemia and Moravia (present-day Czech Republic), there were German Bohemians (Deutschböhmen, Čeští Němci) and German Moravians (Deutschmährer, Moravští Němci), as well as German Silesians, in e.g. the Hlučín Region (part of Czech Silesia but formerly part of the Austrian Silesia Province before Seven Years' War in 1756).

In Slovakia there were two German-speaking enclaves in Hauerland and Spiš. In the Austro-Hungarian Szepes County (Spiš), there were according to censuses 35% Germans in 1869, 25% in 1900 and 1910. There was also a relative German-language majority in the border city of Pressburg/Bratislava: 59.9% at the 1890 census, 41.9% in 1910, 36% in 1919, 28.1 in 1930, 20% in 1940.

There were also two linguistic enclaves in Subcarpathian Ruthenia (present-day Ukraine).

German-speaking urban Jews
Table. Declared Nationality of Jews in Czechoslovakia 

In addition, there was a sizeable German-speaking urban Jewish minority, for instance the writers Franz Kafka, Max Brod and Felix Weltsch, and Jewish politicians were elected as deputies, and even as leaders of German minority parties such as Ludwig Czech and Siegfried Taub in the German Social Democratic Workers Party in the Czechoslovak Republic or Bruno Kafka (second cousin of Franz Kafka) in the German Democratic Liberal Party.

German-language education in Czechoslovakia

Bohemia
 German University in Prague (Karl-Ferdinands-Universität), first bilingual, from 1882 to 1945 two separate universities, a German-language and a Czech-language one
 German Polytechnic University in Prague, first bilingual, from 1869 to 1945 two separate institutes, a German-language and a Czech-language one, from 1874 on different locations

Subcarpathian Ruthenia
In 1936, there were 24 German-language schools in Subcarpathian Ruthenia, grouping 2,021 students.

German-language press in Czechoslovakiain BohemiaPrager Tagblatt (1876-1939)
Prager Presse (1921-1939) semi-official newspaper
Selbstwehr
Jüdische Volksstimmein SlovakiaPressburger Zeitung, then Neue Pressburger Zeitung (1784-1945) (sk)
Westungarischer Grenzbote (1872-1918), then Grenzbote (1919-1945) (eo)
Jüdische Volkszeitung
Israelitisches Familienblatt
Jüdische Pressein Carpathian Ruthenia'''
Jüdische Stimme

German-language personalities in Czechoslovakia

Literature and journalism

Science

Sources

External Links
 Die Selbstwehr (1907-1938), digitized issues of the weekly periodical published in Prague, at the Leo Baeck Institute, New York

See also
Sudeten Germans - German Bohemian people - Germans in the Czech Republic - German Bohemia - Sudetenland
Carpathian Germans - Zipser Germans - Hauerland - Spiš - Demographics of Bratislava
Czechoslovakian Jews
Expulsion of Germans from Czechoslovakia - Brno death march - Ústí massacre - Beneš decrees
American people of German Bohemian descent - Austrian people of German Bohemian descent - German people of German Bohemian descent

Sudetenland
Ethnic groups in Czechoslovakia
Czechoslovakia
Jews and Judaism in Czechoslovakia
Czech Republic–Germany relations
Germany–Slovakia relations